KQBL (101.9 FM) is a radio station licensed to Emmett, Idaho, United States, the station serves the Boise area. The station is currently owned by Iliad Media Group.

KQBL broadcasts in HD Radio.

History
The station went on the air as KMFE on April 4, 1973 at 101.7 FM. On October 4, 1984 the station changed its call sign to KXUU, then on March 19, 1985, the station changed its call sign to KKIC-FM, then on February 26, 1988, to KJHY, on January 20, 2005, to KDBI, & on January 14, 2015, to KPDA, then a month later to the current KQBL.

Bustos Media used to own the station. In September 2010, Bustos transferred most of its licenses to Adelante Media Group as part of a settlement with its lenders. Adelante Media sold KDBI and KQTA to JLD Media, LLC effective December 31, 2014, at a price of $850,000.

On January 16, 2015, KDBI and its "La Gran D" regional Mexican format moved to 106.3 FM, while 101.9 FM changed its call letters to KPDA and began stunting with a loop directing listeners to 106.3.

KPDA then continued to stunt, playing random music, then construction site sound effects before “101.9 The Bull” launched on February 13, 2015, at midnight with a country music format under new KQBL calls. FM Idaho Co., LLC acquired the station effective March 2, 2015, at a price of $700,000.

References

External links

QBL
Radio stations established in 1984